Calochroa whithillii is a species of tiger beetle found in the Western Ghats of India. It is uniformly greenish blue, sometimes with a single white spot in the middle of the elytra. They are often attracted to artificial lights at night.

The labrum is metallic on the sides and dark at the centre. The elytral suture is green. The underside is metallic green and bare. Sometimes a small white spot is present in the middle of the elytra halfway from the base to the tip.

References 

Cicindelidae
Endemic arthropods of India